Since 1989, The Ring has started naming the top 10 pound for pound. This list features fights where the boxers involved were in the active top 10 list at the time of their fight.

2010–2019

2000–2009

1990–1999

See also
 List of The Ring pound for pound rankings
 The Ring
 Pound for pound

References

The Ring (magazine)